Huawei Mediapad M5 is a series of tablets designed and marketed by Huawei, with two model/sizes: the 10.8 inch Pro model and 8.4 inch smaller models, each came with wifi version and wifi+LTE version.

For the larger variant, Huawei also includes a desktop mode which allows the user to switch the mobile interface to traditional desktop interface, by pairing with a keyboard accessory that allows it to work like a laptops.

The Huawei Mediapad M5 is a compact, high-performance Android tablet released to the market in 2018, filling the market gap after Sony's exit from the tablet market.

In 2020, the next M6 model was released based on the 7nm Kirin-980.

References

Android (operating system) devices
Mobile phones introduced in 2018
Huawei mobile phones
Tablet computers